On finding the simple categorization of United States Supreme Court articles on Wikipedia insufficient for purposes of easily searching for case law that deals with a certain topic, this index is being created to make things easier. Topics are listed alphabetically. If a topic has a sub-topic, the subtopic is listed under the main topic. (i.e. Establishment Clause is listed under F as a sub-topic of First Amendment, rather than E)

Hopefully, this will serve the needs of people looking for case law relating to a certain topic.

E
Ex Post Facto Clause
 Calder v. Bull, 3 U.S. 386 (1798)

F
Fourth Amendment
Search and Seizure Clause
 Ex Parte Bollman, 8 U.S. 75 (1807)

H
Habeas corpus
 Ex Parte Bollman, 8 U.S. 75 (1807)

J
Judicial Review
 Hylton v. United States, 3 U.S. 171 (1796)
 Marbury v. Madison, 5 U.S. 137 (1803)
Jurisdiction 
 Federal Question
 State vs. Citizens of another State
 Chisholm v. Georgia, 2 U.S. 419 (1793)

S
Sovereign Immunity
 Chisholm v. Georgia, 2 U.S. 419 (1793)

T
Taxing power
 Hylton v. United States, 3 U.S. 171 (1796)

Law of the United States
Case law lists
 
Indexes of topics by country